Acas District is one of ten districts of the Ocros Province in Peru.

See also 
 Inka Waqanan
 Yanaqi - Qillqamarka

References

States and territories established in 1857
1857 establishments in Peru
Districts of the Ocros Province
Districts of the Ancash Region